Tarek Boukensa (born 19 November 1981 in Annaba) is an Algerian runner, who specializes in the 1500 metres.

Competition record

Personal bests
800 metres - 1:46.10 min (2006)
1500 metres - 3:30.92 min (2007)
3000 metres - 7:43.23 min (2005)

External links

1981 births
Living people
Algerian male middle-distance runners
Athletes (track and field) at the 2004 Summer Olympics
Athletes (track and field) at the 2008 Summer Olympics
Olympic athletes of Algeria
People from Annaba
African Games bronze medalists for Algeria
African Games medalists in athletics (track and field)
Athletes (track and field) at the 2007 All-Africa Games
Athletes (track and field) at the 2001 Mediterranean Games
Athletes (track and field) at the 2005 Mediterranean Games
Mediterranean Games competitors for Algeria
Islamic Solidarity Games competitors for Algeria
Islamic Solidarity Games medalists in athletics
21st-century Algerian people
20th-century Algerian people